"Never Change" is the third single to be taken from Fightstar's third studio album, Be Human and was released on 20 July 2009.

The music video has appeared on Kerrang!, MTV2 and Scuzz.

Track listing
CD:
 "Never Change" (Radio Edit) - 2:58
 "A Short History of the World" - 4:14

Digital Download
 "Never Change" (Radio Edit) - 2:58
 "Never Change" (Acoustic) - 3:06
 "Never Change" (Album Demo) - 3:32
 "A Short History of The World" - 4:14
 "These Days" - 3:20

 "These Days" is a recording of a song written by and was originally recorded by Jackson Browne.
 "A Short History of the World" features the lyrics "Intellects vast and cool and unsympathetic, regarded this earth with envious eyes, and slowly and surely drew their plans against us" which is a quote taken directly from War of the Worlds.

Chart performance

Personnel
 Charlie Simpson — vocals, guitar, keys
 Alex Westaway – guitar, vocals
 Dan Haigh — bass guitar
 Omar Abidi — drums, percussion

Other contributors
 Produced by Carl Bown and Fightstar
 Engineered by Chris Potter
 Mixed by David Bendeth
 Recorded at Treehouse Studios, Chesterfield, Derbyshire
 Artwork by Ryohei Hase

References

External links
 Never Change official video on YouTube.

Fightstar songs
2009 singles
Songs written by Charlie Simpson
Songs written by Alex Westaway
2009 songs